Starting Time is an album by jazz saxophonist Clifford Jordan which was recorded in 1961 and released on the Jazzland label.

Reception

The Allmusic site awarded the album 3 stars. The review by Scott Yanow stated: "The music is straight-ahead, and although the tunes are pretty obscure, the solos and high musicianship uplift the music. Recommended to straight-ahead jazz collectors".

Track listing
All compositions by Clifford Jordan except as indicated
 "Sunrise in Mexico" (Kenny Dorham) - 5:58   
 "Extempore" - 5:15   
 "Down Through the Years" - 4:45   
 "Quittin' Time" - 4:40   
 "One Flight Down" (Cedar Walton) - 4:43   
 "Windmill" (Dorham) - 3:52   
 "Don't You Know I Care" (Duke Ellington, Mack David) - 4:55   
 "Mosaic"  (Walton) - 4:56

Personnel
Clifford Jordan - tenor saxophone
Kenny Dorham - trumpet 
Cedar Walton - piano
Wilbur Ware - bass
Albert Heath - drums

References

1961 albums
Clifford Jordan albums
Jazzland Records (1960) albums
Albums produced by Orrin Keepnews